Osgood is a surname. Notable people with the surname include:

 Bob Osgood (1915-1990), American track and field athlete
 Charles Osgood (1809–1890), American artist
 Charles E. Osgood (1916–1991), American psychologist
 Charles Osgood (born 1933), American radio and television commentator
 Charlie Osgood, American Major League baseball pitcher
 Chris Osgood (born 1972), Canadian ice hockey player
 Dauphin William Osgood (1845–1880), American Board medical missionary to China
 Frances Sargent Osgood (née Locke, 1811–1850), American poet and author
 Gayton P. Osgood (1797–1861), American political figure
 Gretchen Osgood (1868–1961), American actress, singer, poet, and muse
 Herbert L. Osgood (1855–1918), American professor and historian
 Irene Osgood (1875–1922), American author and poet
 Jacob Osgood (1777–1844), American religious figure
 James R. Osgood (1836–1892), American publisher
 Jere Osgood (born 1936), American artisan in furniture and woodworking
 John C. Osgood (1851–1926), Colorado Industrialist
 Kassim Osgood (born 1980), American football player
 Keith Osgood (born 1955), British footballer
 Lawrence Osgood, Canadian-born American author and playwright
 Marion Osgood, American violinist, composer, and orchestra conductor
 Peter Osgood (1947–2006), British footballer
 Robert Bayley Osgood (1873–1956), American orthopedic surgeon and namesake of Osgood–Schlatter disease
 Robert Endicott Osgood (1921–1986), American expert on foreign and military policy and author of several significant texts on international relations
 Rockland Osgood (born 1958), American musician
 Russell K. Osgood (born 1948), American educator, college professor, president of Grinnell College
 Rusty Osgood (born 1966), American filmmaker and actor, AKA "Rusty Nails"
 Samuel Osgood (1747–1813), American merchant and statesman
 Samuel Stillman Osgood (1805–1885), American artist
 Vicky Osgood (1953–2017), British obstetrician
 Wilfred Hudson Osgood (1875–1947), American zoologist
 William Fogg Osgood (1864–1943), American mathematician
 Winchester Osgood (1870–1896), American football player

Characters 
 Petronella Osgood, a Doctor Who character
 Jimmy Osgood, character in the Static Shock episode "Jimmy"
 Osgood Conklin, character in Our Miss Brooks US radio and TV series

See also
Osgood (disambiguation)
Osgoode (disambiguation)
Osgood–Schlatter disease, inflammation of the growth plate at the tibial tuberosity

Surnames of English origin
Surnames of Scandinavian origin
Germanic-language surnames